Barleria mysorensis, a plant species within the genus Barleria of the family Acanthaceae. It is widely used as an ayurvedic plant in India and Sri Lanka. In Sri Lanka, it is known as "Katu Nelu".

References

External links
 Plant List
 'Research Gate

Flora of South Africa
Flora of Sri Lanka
Flora of India (region)
mysorensis
Plants described in 1821